Emily Ducote (born January 1, 1994) is an American mixed martial artist, currently competing in the strawweight division of the Ultimate Fighting Championship (UFC). She previously competed in Invicta FC, where she was the Invicta FC Strawweight Champion.

Background
The daughter of John Ducote and Yvette Bradstreet, Emily was born in Los Angeles, California. Ducote is a Taekwondo Black Belt, first beginning her training in the art at age twelve at her grandparents' recommendation. She wrestled for Los Gatos High School, ending as a runner-up in state championships in her senior year. With an aspiration to wrestle in the best college team, she moved to the Great Plains in 2012 to study kinesiology at Oklahoma City University. She started training Brazilian Jiu-Jitsu in 2013 and was promoted to black belt in May 2022.

Mixed martial arts career

Bellator
Ducote was scheduled to make her Bellator debut against Bruna Vargas at Bellator 159 on July 22, 2016. She won the fight by a second-round rear-naked choke submission.

Ducote was scheduled to face Kenya Miranda at Bellator 161 on September 16, 2016. She won the fight by a second-round armbar submission.

Ducote was scheduled to face Ilima-Lei Macfarlane at Bellator 167 on December 3, 2016. Macfarlane won the fight by unanimous decision, with scores of 30-27, 29-28, 29-28.

Ducote was scheduled to face Katy Collins at Bellator 174 on March 3, 2017. She won the fight by a first-round rear-naked choke submission.

Ducote was scheduled to face Jessica Middleton at Bellator 181 on July 14, 2017. She won the fight by unanimous decision, with scores of 29-27, 29-28, 29-28.

Ducote was scheduled to face Ilima-Lei Macfarlane for the inaugural Bellator Women's Flyweight World Championship at Bellator 186 on November 3, 2017. Macfarlane won the fight by a fifth-round armbar submission.

Ducote was scheduled to face Kristina Williams at Bellator 196 on March 2, 2018. Williams won the fight by split decision in a fight where Ducote was dominant and most part of the media called it a controversial decision. Two of the judges scored the fight 29-28 for Williams, while the third judge scored the fight 30-27 for Ducote.

Ducote was scheduled to face Veta Arteaga at Bellator 202 on July 13, 2018. Arteaga won the fight by unanimous decision, extending Ducote's losing streak to three fights.

After she was released by Bellator, Ducote moved down to strawweight for her next bout against Kathryn Paprocki at Xtreme Fight Night 356 on February 1, 2019. She won the fight by a third-round rear-naked choke submission.

Invicta FC
Ducote was scheduled to make her promotional debut against Janaisa Morandin at Invicta FC 38: Murata vs. Ducote on August 9, 2019. Morandin weighed in three pounds over the strawweight limit, at 119 lbs. Ducote won the fight by a first-round knockout.

In her second promotional appearance, Ducote was scheduled to face Kanako Murata for the vacant Invicta FC Strawweight Championship in the main event of Invicta FC 38: Murata vs. Ducote on November 1, 2019. Murata won the fight by split decision, with two judges scoring the bout 48-47 and 49-46 in her favor. The third judge scored the fight 48-47 for Ducote.

Ducote was scheduled to face Juliana Lima in the main event of Invicta FC 40: Ducote vs. Lima on July 2, 2020. She won the fight by unanimous decision, with all three judges awarding her a 29-28 scorecard.

Ducote was scheduled to face Montserrat Ruiz at Invicta FC 43: King vs. Harrison on November 20, 2020. The fight was later cancelled due to “enhanced COVID-19 safety protocols”.

Ducote was scheduled to face Liz Tracy at Invicta FC on AXS TV: Rodríguez vs. Torquato on May 21, 2021. The fight was later cancelled.

Invicta FC Strawweight Champion
Ducote faced UFC veteran Danielle Taylor for the vacant Invicta FC Strawweight Championship at Invicta FC 44: A New Era on August 27, 2021. Her bout with Taylor headlined the first pay-per-view in Invicta FC history. Ducote won the fight by a first-round knockout. She first stopped Taylor in her tracks with a right straight, before flooring her with a head kick.

In her first title defence, Ducote faced Alesha Zappitella on May 11, 2022 at Invicta FC 47. She won the bout after doctor's stopped the bout after the second round due to a cut on Alesha's eyelid.

Ultimate Fighting Championship
In June 2022, Ducote signed with the UFC.

Ducote made her promotional debut, replacing Brianna Fortino, against Jessica Penne on July 16, 2022 at UFC on ABC 3. She won the fight via unanimous decision.

Ducote faced Angela Hill on December 3, 2022 at UFC on ESPN 42. She lost the bout via unanimous decision.

Ducote is scheduled to face Polyana Viana on April 29, 2023, at UFC Fight Night 223.

Championships and accomplishments 

 Invicta Fighting Championships
 Invicta FC Strawweight Championship (One time)
 One successful title defense

Mixed martial arts record

|-
|Loss
|align=center|12–7
|Angela Hill
|Decision (unanimous)
|UFC on ESPN: Thompson vs. Holland
|
|align=center|3
|align=center|5:00
|Orlando, Florida, United States
|
|-
|Win
|align=center|12–6
|Jessica Penne
|Decision (unanimous)
|UFC on ABC: Ortega vs. Rodríguez
|
|align=center|3
|align=center|5:00
|Elmont, New York, United States
|
|-
|Win
|align=center|11–6
|Alesha Zappitella
|TKO (doctor stoppage)
|Invicta FC 47: Ducote vs. Zappitella
|
|align=center|2
|align=center|5:00
|Kansas City, Kansas, United States
|
|-
|Win
|align=center|10–6
|Danielle Taylor
|KO (punch & head kick)
|Invicta FC 44: A New Era
|
|align=center|1
|align=center|2:51
|Kansas City, Kansas, United States
|
|-
|Win
| style="text-align:center;"|9–6
|Juliana Lima
|Decision (unanimous)
|Invicta FC 40: Ducote vs. Lima
|
| style="text-align:center;"| 3
| style="text-align:center;"| 5:00
|Kansas City, Kansas, United States
|
|-
|Loss
| style="text-align:center;"|8–6
|Kanako Murata
|Decision (split)
|Invicta FC 38: Murata vs. Ducote
|
| style="text-align:center;"| 5
| style="text-align:center;"| 5:00
|Kansas City, Kansas, United States
|
|-
|Win
| style="text-align:center;"|8–5
|Janaisa Morandin
|KO (punches)
|Invicta FC 36: Sorenson vs. Young
|
| style="text-align:center;"| 1
| style="text-align:center;"| 4:03
|Kansas City, Kansas, United States
|
|-
|Win
| style="text-align:center;"|7–5
|Kathryn Paprocki
|Submission (rear-naked choke)
|Xtreme Fight Night 356
|
| style="text-align:center;"| 3
| style="text-align:center;"| 3:31
|Tulsa, Oklahoma, United States
|
|-
|Loss
| style="text-align:center;"|6–5
|Veta Arteaga
|Decision (unanimous)
|Bellator 202
|
| style="text-align:center;"| 3
| style="text-align:center;"| 5:00
|Thackerville, Oklahoma, United States
|
|-
|Loss
| style="text-align:center;"|6–4
|Kristina Williams
|Decision (split)
|Bellator 196
|
| style="text-align:center;"| 3
| style="text-align:center;"| 5:00
|Thackerville, Oklahoma, United States
|
|-
|Loss
| style="text-align:center;"|6–3
|Ilima-Lei Macfarlane
|Submission (triangle armbar)
|Bellator 186
|
| style="text-align:center;"| 5
| style="text-align:center;"| 3:42
|University Park, Pennsylvania, United States
|
|-
|Win
| style="text-align:center;"|6–2
|Jessica Middleton
|Decision (unanimous)
|Bellator 181
|
| style="text-align:center;"| 3
| style="text-align:center;"| 5:00
|Thackerville, Oklahoma, United States
|
|-
|Win
| style="text-align:center;"|5–2
|Katy Collins
|Submission (rear-naked choke)
|Bellator 174
|
| style="text-align:center;"| 1
| style="text-align:center;"| 4:53
|Thackerville, Oklahoma, United States
|
|-
|Loss
| style="text-align:center;"|4–2
|Ilima-Lei Macfarlane
|Decision (unanimous)
|Bellator 167
|
| style="text-align:center;"| 3
| style="text-align:center;"| 5:00
|Thackerville, Oklahoma, United States
|
|-
|Win
| style="text-align:center;"|4–1
|Kenya Miranda
|Submission (armbar)
|Bellator 161
|
| style="text-align:center;"| 2
| style="text-align:center;"| 4:37
|Cedar Park, Texas, United States
|
|-
|Win
| style="text-align:center;"|3–1
|Bruna Vargas
|Submission (rear-naked choke)
|Bellator 159
|
| style="text-align:center;"| 2
| style="text-align:center;"| 0:29
|Mulvane, Kansas, United States
|
|-
|Win
| style="text-align:center;"|2–1
|Jianna Denizard
|Decision (unanimous)
|Xtreme Fighting League
|
| style="text-align:center;"| 5
| style="text-align:center;"| 3:00
|Tulsa, Oklahoma, United States
|
|-
|Win
| style="text-align:center;"|1–1
|Ronnie Nanney
|Decision (unanimous)
|OKC Charity Fight Night
|
| style="text-align:center;"| 5
| style="text-align:center;"| 3:00
|Oklahoma City, Oklahoma, United States
|
|-
|Loss
| style="text-align:center;"|0–1
|Emily Whitmire
|Decision (unanimous)
|FCF 50
|
| style="text-align:center;"| 3
| style="text-align:center;"| 5:00
|Shawnee, Oklahoma, United States
|
|-
|}

See also
 List of female mixed martial artists
 List of current mixed martial arts champions
 List of current UFC fighters

References

External links

1994 births
Living people
American female mixed martial artists
Strawweight mixed martial artists
Flyweight mixed martial artists
Mixed martial artists utilizing taekwondo
Mixed martial artists utilizing Muay Thai
Mixed martial artists utilizing Brazilian jiu-jitsu
American Muay Thai practitioners
Female Muay Thai practitioners
American practitioners of Brazilian jiu-jitsu
Female Brazilian jiu-jitsu practitioners
People awarded a black belt in Brazilian jiu-jitsu
21st-century American women
American female taekwondo practitioners